Habito is a surname. Notable people with the surname include:

Cielito Habito (born 1953), Filipino economist, academic, and journalist
Ruben Habito (born 1947), Filipino Zen Buddhist and writer